Denise Mobalaji Ajayi-Williams is the chief executive officer and co-founder of Silicon Valley- Nigerian Economic Development Inc. (SV-NED). SV-NED Inc is an accelerator that bridged the connection between Silicon Valley and the rest of the world. Over the last decade, the SV-NED Inc. empire has acquired 1 billion reach and built strong relationships with 50 thousand business owners and professionals with interest in technology. Williams serves on the board of 5 companies, including SV-NED Inc., Global Connection for Women Foundation, Sky Clinic Connect, Numly, and Collabful.

Early life and education 
Williams earned her bachelor's degree in Economics from the University of California, Riverside, and her Masters in Business Administration Degree with a concentration in Marketing from Golden Gate University, Ageno School of Business. Williams' professional career was spent working for premier and leading Healthcare organizations including Kaiser Permanente, Gilead Sciences, Abbott Laboratories, and the State of CA Department of Public Health. Williams is a recipient of several distinguished awards, including a US Congressional Award for Outstanding Contributions from Congresswoman Barbara Lee, a US Senatorial Award from Senator Dianne Feinstein for Outstanding Community Leadership, and Visionary Award from Actor Danny Glover.

Career 
Williams has been featured in several publications, including Forbes, CNBC, GritDaly, Huffington Post, Guardian, Thrive Global, and Black Enterprise. Williams is most passionate about building a bridge of economic prosperity between the Silicon Valley technology mecca of the world and emerging countries from around the world. Her spare time is devoted to promoting childhood literacy and diversity, which can be observed through her journey as the Author of the children's book series, Akiti the Hunter, the 1st African Action Superhero. Akiti the Hunter, is being reworked into an animation series and animated motion picture movie.

Personal life 
Ajayi-Williams has a son with her husband Hayden Williams III who is also the co-founder of their WM Journal platform and Working Moms in 1920s organisation.

References 

Nigerian cartoonists
Nigerian women novelists
Yoruba-language literature
University of California, Riverside alumni
Golden Gate University alumni
Year of birth missing (living people)
Living people
American people of Nigerian descent
American people of Yoruba descent
Yoruba women writers
American corporate directors
American women business executives
American social entrepreneurs
African-American women in business
Yoruba women in business
African-American women writers
20th-century births
21st-century African-American people
20th-century African-American people
20th-century African-American women
21st-century African-American women